The Social Democrats are a centre-left, social-democratic political party in Ireland. The party was launched on 15 July 2015 by three independent Teachtaí Dála, Catherine Murphy, and Róisín Shortall, and Stephen Donnelly. It promotes the Nordic model and pro-European views.

On 22 February 2023, Murphy and Shortall announced their departure as leaders of the party. They were succeeded by Holly Cairns who was elected unopposed on 1 March 2023.

History

Founding and early elections
The Social Democrats was established with a co-leadership arrangement between its three founding members. Róisín Shortall is a former Labour Party TD and former Minister of State at the Department of Health. She resigned from the role and from Labour in September 2012, citing lack of support and the lack of an explanation from then-Minister for Health James Reilly concerning his controversial decision to locate a new primary care centre in his own constituency. Catherine Murphy was successively a member of the Workers' Party, Democratic Left and the Labour Party before being elected as an independent TD in 2005. Stephen Donnelly first entered politics as an independent TD in the 2011 general election, having previously worked as a consultant for McKinsey and Company. Both Murphy and Donnelly were members of the Technical Group in the 31st Dáil, with Murphy having served as its Chief Whip.

The party ran fourteen candidates in the 2016 general election, including its three incumbent TDs, former Labour Party Senator James Heffernan, and county councillors Gary Gannon and Cian O'Callaghan.

In May 2016, the party formed a technical group within the Dáil with the Green Party.

On 5 September 2016, Stephen Donnelly resigned as joint leader and left the party, stating that he was doing so "with great sadness, having vested so much together with my parliamentary colleagues, Catherine and Roisin, a small core team and many volunteers across the country, into the establishment of the Social Democrats over the last 20 months", but referring to his relationship with his fellow leaders, that "some partnerships simply don't work". On 2 February 2017, he joined Fianna Fáil.

Through 2017, the Social Democrats recruited several sitting county councillors, including Jennifer Whitmore (Wicklow County Council), Joe Harris (Cork County Council), Dermot Looney (South Dublin County Council), and Paul Mulville (Fingal County Council).  In February 2018, June Murphy (Cork County Council) joined the party. In 2022, Mary Roche (Waterford County Council) joined the party.

In May 2019, 19 of the party's 58 candidates were elected as councillors its first local elections. The party also contested their first European Parliament elections in May 2019, with sitting councillor Gary Gannon receiving 20,331 votes (5.6% of the total vote) in the Dublin constituency. The party did not contest the other Irish constituencies of Midlands-North-West or South at this election.

In November 2019, the party contested 3 of the 4 by-elections caused by the election of Irish TDs to the European Parliament, but did not win any seats, with their candidates all receiving between 2.5% and 4.4% of the vote.

In the 2020 general election, the party ran 20 candidates in 20 constituencies, and increased their seats to six, despite a small fall in the number of first preference votes received.

Since 2017, Alan Kelly of the Labour Party has made repeated calls for the Social Democrats to merge with the Labour party, but has been firmly rebuffed each time by the Social Democrats' party leadership, who say there is no interest of any kind in such a move.

Holly Cairns as leader
On 22 February 2023, Murphy and Shortall announced that they would step down as co-leaders of the Social Democrats, with a successor to be appointed at an "early date". Gannon said that he would not run for leadership. Cairns announced on 26 February 2023, that she would run for leader of Social Democrats. Nominations were due to close on 1 March, but none of the other TDs within the party chose to run in the election and as result Cairns was announced as the new leader. On becoming leader, Cairns reiterated that the Social Democrats have no interest in merging with the Labour Party, and that housing and Sláintecare would be red line issues for the Social Democrats in any coalition talks with any party.

Ideology and policies
At the party's launch, its three TDs stated their support for the Nordic model of social democracy, backed the repeal of the Eighth Amendment and the Official Secrets Act, and stated their opposition to domestic water charges. The party's manifesto for the 2016 general election listed commitments to "three core areas":
 Policies that support a healthy, inclusive and progressive society
 Policies that ensure a strong, stable and vibrant economy, and support Ireland's SMEs with the same vigour that is applied to the multinational sector
 Policies that make politics and government more transparent and responsive to public, rather than party need

It supports Irish membership of the European Union. The party is also in favour of a directly elected mayor of Dublin.

Health policies 
One of the core policies put forward by the party is that of Sláintecare, an Irish national health service. Sláintecare is a fully costed plan for a universal, single-tier public health service that would join up health and social care in the Republic of Ireland. Sláintecare was developed as the result of a cross-Party Oireachtas Committee chaired by Róisín Shortall, which sought to examine the issue of healthcare in Ireland. The report was published in May 2017 and marked the first time cross-party consensus was achieved on a new model of healthcare in Ireland. The Sláintecare policy plan also includes (but is not limited to): a legal entitlement to homecare packages for older people, significantly reducing prescription charges and lowering costs for medicines, providing access to basic procedures at a local level, and improved funding for mental health, including counselling, community programmes, and adult mental health teams.

Housing policies 
The Social Democrats are in favour of universal access to affordable housing. In May 2017 the party published the Urban Regeneration and Housing Bill to eliminate loopholes to the vacant site levy and increase penalties for developers engaged in land hoarding. In January 2018 the party called for a nationwide rent freeze. In December 2019 the party proposed a motion of no-confidence in housing minister Eoghan Murphy.

Social policies 
The Social Democrats have published legislation on equal access and non-religious discrimination in schools, extended unpaid parental leave and greater minimum notice periods for residential tenancies. The party called for a yes vote in the Referendum to Repeal the Eighth Amendment on 25 May 2018. At its 2018 National Conference, the party became one of the few in Ireland – along with People Before Profit – to formally adopt a position calling for repeal of anti-sex work legislation (Part 4 of the Criminal Law (Sexual Offences) Act 2017), and support decriminalisation of sex work, in line with the New Zealand model.

Anti-corruption 
The party has called for the establishment of an independent anti-corruption agency in Ireland to tackle white-collar crime and corruption in the corporate world and political spheres.

Leadership

Election results

Dáil Éireann

Local elections

European Parliament

Electoral performance

2016 general election
The party fielded 15 candidates and received 3% of first preference votes nationally with its three leaders re-elected on the first count in their respective constituencies.

2019 local and European elections 
The Social Democrats contested their first European Parliament elections in May 2019, with Councillor Gary Gannon running for election in the Dublin constituency. Gannon received 5.6% of the first-preference votes, finishing 6th out of 19 candidates in the first count. He was eliminated on the 14th count.

The party also contested their first local elections in May 2019. The Social Democrats put forward 58 candidates for seats on local councils. 55% of the candidates were women, making it the second highest percentage of female candidates put forward among all political parties. 19 of the 58 candidates were elected, more than trebling the party's representation in local government. Ellie Kisyombe, a Malawi-born asylum seeker running for the Social Democrats in Dublin's North Inner City LEA, was retained after a review of inconsistencies in her account of her asylum history and time in Direct Provision, which caused several party members to resign from the National Executive.

Mary Callaghan, who was elected to represent Ballymun-Finglas on Dublin City Council in 2019 was elected Deputy Lord Mayor of Dublin to Green Party Lord Mayor Hazel Chu in 2020. In January 2022, Eoin O'Broin, an independent councillor previously elected to South Dublin County Council, joined the party. In November 2022, Mary Roche, an independent councillor who was co-opted onto Waterford City and County Council in 2020, joined the party. In January 2023, Owen Hanley resigned his membership of the Social Democrats and his Galway City Council seat, pending an investigation into use of an anonymous social media account. His seat was co-opted by Alan Curran in February. In February 2023, Catherine Stocker, elected to the Clontarf local electoral area of Dublin City Council, became the first council member to be able to avail of maternity leave. Karl Stanley was co-opted to fill her seat for the duration.

2020 general election
The Social Democrats fielded 20 candidates in the 2020 general election. They returned six TDs to the Dáil in February 2020: Murphy and Shortall were re-elected in their constituencies, and were joined by Holly Cairns in Cork South-West, Gary Gannon in Dublin Central, Cian O'Callaghan in Dublin Bay North and Jennifer Whitmore in Wicklow. The Social Democrats finished level on seats with the Labour Party and exceeded the seats of other left-leaning parties Solidarity–People Before Profit and Independents 4 Change.

References

External links

2015 establishments in Ireland
Centre-left parties in Europe
Left-wing politics in Ireland
Political parties established in 2015
Political parties in the Republic of Ireland
Pro-European political parties in Ireland
Social democratic parties in Europe
Social democratic parties in Ireland